Chondropoma callipeplum is a species of small operculate land snail, terrestrial gastropod mollusk in the family Pomatiidae.

This species is endemic to Nicaragua.

References

Pomatiidae
Gastropods described in 1961
Taxonomy articles created by Polbot